Maria Ibars i Ibars (1892–1965) was a Valencian writer and teacher who wrote in Spanish and Catalan.

Early life and education 
Maria Ibars i Ibars was born on February 29, 1892, in Valencia, and grew up in Dénia. She studied in Valencia to become a teacher.

Career 
Between 1916 and 1934, Ibars i Ibars taught at La Font de la Figuera, then moved to Valencia, where she continued teaching and focused on literary and pedagogical activities. She participated in the activities of the literary and philological section of Lo Rat Penat.

Ibars i Ibars wrote in Spanish and Catalan and published in Las Provincias, El Vers Valencià, Pensat i Fet, L’Altar del Mercat, Glorieta, Sicània and La Marina. Her body of work consists mostly of novels, but she also wrote poetry and theatre pieces. Many of her works were inspired by Dénia and its surroundings.

Death and legacy 
Ibars i Ibars died on January 9, 1965, in Valencia. A school in Dénia bears her name, she was also officially named the adopted daughter of the city. María Teresa Oller set three of her poems to music.

Works 

 Poemas de Penyamar, 1949
 Como una garra, 1961
 La descalumniada, 1961
 Camp d’ús, 1961
 Vides planes, 1962
 Graciamar, 1963
 L’últim serv, 1963
 La fe dels altres, 1965
 La presa, 1966
 El miracle de Teulada (play), 1992
 Contalles a l’ombra del Montgó (contains: La descalumniada, Camp d’ús, La fe dels altres and La presa), 1994

References 

1892 births
1965 deaths
Writers from the Valencian Community
20th-century Spanish women writers
20th-century Spanish novelists
Spanish women novelists
20th-century Spanish poets
Spanish women poets
20th-century Spanish dramatists and playwrights
Spanish women dramatists and playwrights
Catalan-language writers
People from the Province of Alicante